Euan Norris (born 29 October 1977) was a Scottish football referee who was active in the Scottish Premier League.

Norris became a FIFA referee in 2009. He has officiated in UEFA Euro 2012 qualification.

References

Living people
Scottish football referees
1977 births
Scottish Football League referees
Scottish Premier League referees
Scottish Professional Football League referees